The Rap of China, formerly known as , is a Chinese rap competition show produced by iQiyi. The show was carried out in the form of three groups of producers Kris Wu, Will Pan, MC HotDog and Chang Chen-yue judging the performance of the participating students, and received great attention. In the end, after fierce competition among players and difficult choices of producers, China's hip-hop first season produced two annual championships, GAI (musician) and PG ONE.

On April 9, 2018, the official Weibo of "The Rap of China 2"  was launched. On May 17, the instructor of the second season confirmed that in addition to the original Kris Wu, Will Pan, MC HotDog and Chang Chen-yue in the first season, there would also be the newly added G.E.M., which was broadcast on July 14, 2018.

Episodes

Series overview

Season 1 (2017)
The first episode of season one of The Rap of China aired on 24 June 2017.  The producers were Chinese-Canadian rapper-singer Kris Wu, Taiwanese-American singer Will Pan, Taiwanese rapper MC HotDog and Taiwanese rock musician Chang Chen-yue. Notable rappers such as HipHopMan, Tizzy T, PG One, BrAnTB, Jony J, After Journey, VAVA, GAI, Bridge, Ty. and others participated in this season. The finals were competed between the top three contestants PG One, GAI and After Journey as well as Jony J, who was resurrected from his earlier elimination. PG One and GAI were announced joint winners after the final round of voting ended up in a draw.

Rounds
Round One (Open Auditions): Open auditions were held in Beijing. Rappers would rap without music and if the producers liked it, they would hand the rapper a chain that indicates that they move on to the next round.

Round Two (60 Second Rap): Contestants that passed would be given 60 seconds each to present their prepared rap to the producers. They only need one producer to pass for them to move on; however, if all the producers fail them, they would be eliminated.

Round Three (Team Cypher): Contestants draw a name from a hat to pick their temporary team. Each team takes a turn to freestyle to a beat on a topic that their producer chose. If they don’t get the microphone in the time permitted or their rap is deemed not good enough, they are chosen for elimination.

Round Four (1 vs 1 Battle): Based on their assessment in the previous round, the contestants chose an opponent to battle against. They choose a beat and create a song together that is performed. When they battle, producers vote on who was better and the loser is eliminated. The 20 contestants who were eliminated in the 1 vs 1 battles return and each producer team chooses one rapper to return.

Round Five (Team Selection): Each producer team performs in front of the contestants and an audience who votes for their favorite. From the votes, the judges earn chances to select rappers to form teams. The producers sit on one side of the doors and contestants enter from the opposite room. If both the producer and contestant stand at the door, the contestant makes it into that producer's team. If not, they will still have a chance at being chosen later on. Each team can have up to 5 members.

Round Six (Team Performance Part I): Each team has a short amount of time after selection to create a team song to a chosen beat. They perform in front of an audience that votes for the member that they think did the worst. That member is then eliminated.

Round Seven (Team Performance Part II): Once again, each team creates a team song; however, they perform for just the producers this time around. The producer of each team chooses a member to eliminate from their team.

Round Eight (Demon Challenge and Team Performance): A mainstream artist is invited on the show and assesses a member from each team. Both separately perform a prepared song. Representatives from media companies vote on their performances. If the contestant wins, they immediately advance to the top 6. The producers and their teams create a song together and perform it for the audience. The team with the most votes can save a member while the second team is up for elimination. The last team is forced to immediately eliminate one member.

Round Nine (Semi-finals Part I): The top 6 are drawn against one another to each perform a song. Renowned music producers then vote on which contestant was better in each battle. The 3 losing contestants battle against each other and 2 are eliminated.

Round Ten (Semi-finals Part II): The 4 contestants team up with a guest singer for a performance. The 2 rappers with the lowest votes compete against each other and one is eliminated.

Round Eleven (Finals): The remaining 3 rappers as well as one resurrected rapper perform to a live audience. Votes decides who moves on until there are only 2 rappers left. The final 2 contestants each perform a song and the winner is decided by a combination of votes from invited peers and the producers.

Annual Ranking 

 GAI (musician)  and PG ONE tied for the championship.
 Jony J entered the finals as a non-card and won the third runner-up in the year
 VAVA is the top four player of the year produced by the main game system, but unfortunately, she lost to Jony J in the wild card game.

Promotion
Members of The Rap of China appeared on Happy Camp on September 2, 2017.

Season 2 (2018)
The first episode of season two of The Rap of China aired on 14 July 2018. The producers were Chinese-Canadian rapper-singer Kris Wu, Taiwanese-American singer Will Pan, Hong Kong singer G.E.M., Taiwanese rapper MC HotDog and Taiwanese rock musician Chang Chen-yue. Open auditions were held outside of mainland China for the first time in Los Angeles, Melbourne and Kuala Lumpur. Notable rappers such as Manshuke (Young Jack), Wang Yitai (3HO), KungFu-Pen, Lexie Liu, Vinida, Nick Chou, Li Jialong (JelloRio), Al Rocco, Nawukere (Lil-Em), ICE and others participated in this season. The finals were competed between the top three contestants Nawukere (Lil-Em), ICE and Lexie Liu as well as Aire (AIR), who was resurrected from his earlier elimination. Aire (AIR) defeated Nawukere (Lil-Em) in the final round of voting and was named champion.

Season 3 (2019)
The first episode of season three of The Rap of China aired on 14 June 2019. The producers were Chinese-Canadian rapper-singer Kris Wu, Taiwanese-American singer Will Pan, Hong Kong singer G.E.M., Taiwanese rapper MC HotDog and Taiwanese rock musician Chang Chen-yue. Notable rappers such as Huang Xu (BooM), Damnshine, Liu Cong (Key.L), KungFu-Pen, L4WUDU, Yang Hesu (KeyNG), Xiao En'en (Sean T), NINEONE, OBi, SIO and others participated in this season. The finals were competed between the top three contestants Huang Xu (BooM), Damnshine and Xinxiu as well as Yang Hesu (KeyNG), who was resurrected from his earlier elimination. Yang Hesu (KeyNG) defeated Huang Xu (BooM) in the final round of voting by just a single vote and was named champion.

Season 4 (2020)
The first episode of season four of The Rap of China aired on 14 August 2020. The label supervisors were Chinese-Canadian rapper-singer Kris Wu, Taiwanese-American singer Will Pan, Chinese singer Jane Zhang and Chinese rapper GAI. Korean-American rapper Jay Park participated in the season as a guest judge. Notable rappers such Li Jialong (JelloRio), BrAnTB, Li Daben (Benzo), AnsrJ, Lil Shin, Wang Qiming (WatchMe), Vinida, GALI, Xiaoqinglong (Dragon), Kafe.Hu and others participated in this season. The finals were competed between the top four contestants Li Jialong (JelloRio), Wang Qiming (WatchMe), GALI and KAFE.HU as well as Li Daben (Benzo), who was resurrected from his earlier elimination. Li Jialong (JelloRio) defeated Wang Qiming (WatchMe) in the final round of voting and was named champion.

Impact
The show quickly grew in popularity and reached 100 million views in four hours when its first episode aired. It accumulated 1.3 billion views in a little over a month. The show is credited for making hip hop mainstream in China, as several contestants rose to stardom and were signed to record deals.

Awards and nominations 
The first season of The Rap of China received various awards:

 2017 Weibo TV Influential ceremony, annual excellent online variety shows.
 2018 iQiyi Screaming Night, annual producer and annual variety shows.
 The 2017 Sohu Fashion Festival, the hottest online variety show of the year.
 "New Weekly" "2017 China Video List", "Annual Program", "Annual Draft" two awards.
 2017 China Variety Show Ingenuity Ceremony", seven awards including annual ingenuity editing, annual ingenuity visual effects, annual ingenuity brand marketing, annual ingenuity screenwriting, annual ingenuity Director, and gala work.
 The first Golden Mackerel Award, the 2017 Top Ten Network Comprehensive Awards.

Controversies
The show has been accused of plagiarizing South Korean rap competition show Show Me the Money. There were rumors that iQiyi already bought the rights for the show from CJ E&M; however, Mnet stated "Show Me the Money is not the content which CJ E&M sold the rights."

In addition, since the release of "China Has Hip Hop", many rappers have released diss tracks about the show.  NetEase Music has included a considerable number of diss songs on The Rap of China.  Some rappers stated in their diss tracks that they and other rappers spent a lot of money and went to Beijing to compete in the show, but only appeared on screen for a few second, or not all.  Producers of the show were accused of overlooking talented artists, and others critiqued the mentors invited by the show for being less talented than the participants. Other controversies included the inclusion of hanmai participants, as there is debate as to whether hanmai, a style of Chinese party rap, is considered hiphop. Many people emphatically blamed Kris Wu and Che Che, and affirmed their respect for some of the well-known rappers.  Some netizens commented: "There is hip-hop in China, but not in iQiyi".

After the government cracked down on some of the participants in the first season, the second season and further were accused of being overly sanitized: contestants had to adhere strictly to Chinese nationalism and omit most references to sex, drugs, or cops.

See also
 Rap Star, rap competition show on Mango TV
 Rap for Youth, rap competition show on Bilibili

References

External links
 
 The Rap of China on iQIYI

Chinese reality television series
2017 Chinese television series debuts
Television shows involved in plagiarism controversies
Chinese music television series
Chinese-language television shows